Hawthorne Bluff is a rock bluff at the south end of the McAllister Hills in Victoria Land, Antarctica. It was named by the Advisory Committee on Antarctic Names in 2004 after Ann Parks Hawthorne, a photographer from Washington, D.C., who photodocumented the U.S. Antarctic Program in several field seasons, 1984–2003.

References

Cliffs of Victoria Land
Scott Coast